Governor Jordan may refer to:

Chester B. Jordan (1839–1914), 48th Governor of New Hampshire
Leonard B. Jordan (1899–1983), 23rd Governor of Idaho